J. N. Adam–AM&A Historic District is a national historic district located at Buffalo in Erie County, New York.  The district resulted from the agglomeration of commercial structures over many years of commercial growth and still reflects conscious decisions made by the original planners of the J. N. Adam & Co., and later AM&A's department stores.  The main department store was designed by Starrett & van Vleck and built in 1935, with additions made in 1946–1948. The service building and entrances date to 1909 and is a six-story, brick flat roofed commercial structure.  Two six story, brick commercial structures fronting on Washington Street were designed by Green & Wicks in the 1890s.  A five-story steel frame warehouse building fronting on Washington Street dates to 1911–1912.  Connected to it are a warehouse building dating to 1882, one dating to 1906–1907, and one fronting on Ellicott Street and dating to 1912–1913.

Plans announced in January 2010 are for the complex to be converted to apartments and offices.

It was listed on the National Register of Historic Places in 2009.

References

External links

Buildings and structures in Buffalo, New York
Commercial buildings on the National Register of Historic Places in New York (state)
Neoclassical architecture in New York (state)
Geography of Buffalo, New York
Historic districts in Buffalo, New York
Historic districts on the National Register of Historic Places in New York (state)
National Register of Historic Places in Buffalo, New York